This is a list of airlines currently operating in Saudi Arabia.

Scheduled airlines

Charter airlines

Cargo airlines

See also
 List of airlines
 List of defunct airlines of Saudi Arabia
 List of defunct airlines of Asia
 List of airports in Saudi Arabia

External links
 Airlines in Saudi Arabia

Saudi Arabia
Airlines
Airlines
Saudi Arabua